U.S. Highway 6 (US-6) in the U.S. state of Nebraska is a United States Numbered Highway which goes from the Colorado border west of Imperial in the west to the Iowa border in the east at Omaha. Significant portions of the highway are concurrent with other highways, most significantly, US-34 between Culbertson and Hastings. Also, from Milford east to the Iowa border, the highway is closely paralleled by Interstate 80 (I-80). Large portions of the route parallel the Chicago, Burlington and Quincy Railroad.

Route description

Before concurrency with US-34

US-6 enters Nebraska from Colorado west of Imperial on a short southeasterly segment. It turns east and stays due east until shortly before Imperial. It then goes into Imperial and meets Nebraska Highway 61 (N-61). The two routes are paired together until they separate at the Enders Reservoir State Recreation Area. It goes in a generally southeasterly direction until it meets US-34 west of Culbertson.

Western Nebraska
US-6 and US-34 continue east together through Culbertson and at McCook, is briefly concurrent with US-83. US-6/US-34 continue together in a northeasterly direction through Cambridge, then turns due east and meets US-283 in Arapahoe. Near Edison, it meets US-136, which begins at its intersection with US-6/US-34. Further east, the two highways meet N-4 and turns northeast toward Holdrege. In Holdrege, US-6/US-34 meet US-183. The highways continue on a northeasterly trajectory through Minden until Heartwell. At Heartwell, US-6/US-34 turns due east until Hastings. In Hastings, US-6/US-34 meet US-281 and US-34 separates to go with US-281 while US-6 continues eastward.

Eastern Nebraska
US-6 continues on a due east highway from Hastings. Near Sutton, the highway turns northeast to go through Sutton. It continues east, and, at Fairmont, US-6 encounters US-81. After passing through Friend, US-6 meets N-15, and the two highways overlap until shortly before Milford. US-6 goes east, then north out of Milford, then US-6 turns east to go toward Lincoln.

Lancaster County
In Lincoln, US-6 comes into the city on West "O" Street, portions of which are divided highway. At Sun Valley Boulevard, it turns to go northeasterly. At North 10th Street, US-6 turns north-northwest and becomes North 11th Street, a divided highway. At Cornhusker Highway, US-6 turns east with a short urban connection to I-180 on the west along Cornhusker. US-6 then follows Cornhusker Highway, which is a divided highway, northeast out of the city. At the eastern end of Cornhusker Highway (near Waverly), US-6 meets I-80.

Omaha
From I-80, US-6 goes northeast through Waverly, Greenwood, and Ashland. East of Ashland, US-6 crosses the Platte River. After that, US-6 meets N-31 in Gretna, where US-6 turns north with N-31 on a divided highway. US-6/N-31 meet US-275 and N-92 near the Elkhorn neighborhood of Omaha, and they separate in Elkhorn itself at a freeway interchange which also has Nebraska Link 28B, a connector to US-275.

At this point, US-6 goes onto the freeway, the West Dodge Expressway, and turns due east to go toward Fowntown Omaha. At 137th Street is the exit for Boys Town. Between 120th and 108th streets, US-6 is an elevated freeway with separate viaducts for eastbound and westbound traffic. Shortly after this ends, US-6 meets I-680. East of I-680, US-6 continues east as West Dodge Road and at Cass Street, turns briefly southeast where West Dodge Road ends, and follows Dodge Street eastward. Before North 30th Street, US-6 splits into two one-way streets, with Dodge Street serving westbound traffic, and Douglas Street serving the eastbound. US-6 goes through downtown and then goes up onto I-480, which is an elevated freeway around Downtown Omaha, and, shortly thereafter, crosses into Iowa via the Grenville Dodge Memorial Bridge.

History

When the U.S. Numbered Highway System was created in 1926, much of the current US-6 in Nebraska was US-38. The route was slightly different in the Omaha area, as it turned east from 204th Street onto Q Street to go through what was the city of Millard. It went through Millard on what is now Millard Avenue (N-50), then north on 132nd Street, then east on Center Street, and then north on 36th Street to end at Farnam Street. In 1932, US-38 was deleted and replaced by US-6.

The cities of Hastings and Lincoln also each had a US-6 City. These are former routes for US-6 in those cities. US-6 City in Hastings was deleted in 1970 and, in Lincoln, US-6 City was deleted in 1983.

Future 
The Nebraska Department of Roads is planning a total rebuild and partial realignment/rerouting of US-6 from its current path along Sun Valley Boulevard in Lincoln. The project is years away from being built.

Commemorative and other highway names
Grand Army of the Republic Highway (statewide)
Carl T. Curtis Drive in Kearney County
West "O" Street, Sun Valley Boulevard, North 11th Street, Cornhusker Highway in Lincoln
204th Street, West Dodge Expressway, West Dodge Road, Dodge Street, Douglas Street, Gerald R. Ford Expressway in Omaha

Major intersections

See also
Dodge Street
Lincoln Highway (Omaha)
Saddle Creek Underpass

References

External links

The Nebraska Highways Page: Highways 1 to 30
Nebraska Roads: US 6-38

06
 Nebraska
Transportation in Omaha, Nebraska
Transportation in Chase County, Nebraska
Transportation in Hayes County, Nebraska
Transportation in Hitchcock County, Nebraska
Transportation in Red Willow County, Nebraska
Transportation in Furnas County, Nebraska
Transportation in Harlan County, Nebraska
Transportation in Phelps County, Nebraska
Transportation in Kearney County, Nebraska
Transportation in Adams County, Nebraska
Transportation in Clay County, Nebraska
Transportation in Fillmore County, Nebraska
Transportation in Saline County, Nebraska
Transportation in Seward County, Nebraska
Transportation in Lincoln, Nebraska
Transportation in Cass County, Nebraska
Transportation in Saunders County, Nebraska
Transportation in Sarpy County, Nebraska
Transportation in Douglas County, Nebraska